

Flora

Lycophytes

Lycophyte research
Wehr (1998) reports, without description, Selaginella species spikemoss fossils occurring in the Eocene Okanagan highlands Klondike Mountain Formation.

Fungi

Fungal research
Currah, Stockey, & LePage (1998) describe the a phyllachoralean "tar spot" parasitizing Uhlia palm leaves, and host for a hyperparasitic pleosporalean fungus. They note them to be one of the first occurrences of hyperparasitic relationships in the fossil record.

Arthropods

Insects

Molluscs

Bivalves

Amphibians

newly named anurans

Archosauromorpha

Dinosaurs
 A paper in the journal Nature is published by Karen Chin and others announcing the earlier discovery of a "king-sized coprolite" attributed to Tyrannosaurus rex.
 Lourinhasaurus gastroliths documented.
 Cedarosaurus gastroliths documented.
 Caudipteryx gastroliths documented.
 Volunteers from the Denver Museum of Natural History discovered Tony's Bone Bed in the Cedar Mountain Formation's Poison Strip Member.

Data courtesy of George Olshevsky's dinosaur genera list.

Newly named birds

Pterosaurs

New taxa

References

 Dantas, P.M., Freitas, C., Azevedo, T. Sanz, J.L., Galopim de Carvalho, A.M., Santos, D., Ortega, F., Santos, V., Sanz, J.L., Silva, C.M. & Cachão, M. (1998). Estudo dos Gastrólitos do Dinossáurio Lourinhasaurus do Jurássico Superior Português. Actas do V Congresso Nacional de Geologia. 84 (1): A87-A90.
 DiCroce, K. and K. Carpenter. (2001). "New ornithopod from the Cedar Mountain Formation (Lower Cretaceous) of Eastern Utah". pp. 183–196 in: Tanke, D. & K. Carpenter (eds.)  Mesozoic Vertebrate Life. Indiana University Press, Bloomington.
 Qiang, J., .Currie, P.J., Norell., M.A. & Shu-An, J., 1998. Two feathered dinosaurs from northeastern China. Nature 393 753–761.
 Sanders, F.H. & Carpenter, K. (1998). Gastroliths from a camarasaurid in the Cedar Mountain Formation. Journal of Vertebrate Paleontology. Abstracts with program. 18 (3): 74A.

 
1990s in paleontology
Paleontology